Schizothorax curvilabiatus is a species of ray-finned fish in the genus Schizothorax. It is found in the lower reaches of the Yarlung Tsangpo River and in Tibet where it is found the shallower areas of relatively fast-flowing streams and rivers which have stream beds of gravel or rock.

References 

Schizothorax
Fish described in 1992